Tall Blonde Helicopter is the third studio album from British musician Francis Dunnery, released in 1995. The album showed Dunnery stripping down the arrangements and production of the previous album, and the material focused more on his acoustic guitar playing, giving it a folk-rock flavour. Three singles were released from the album; "Too Much Saturn", "The Way Things Are" and "I Believe I Can Change My World". To promote the album, Atlantic Records released a VHS cassette with sixteen minutes of footage, including live material. "Father and Son" is a cover version of a Cat Stevens song.

Track listing

Personnel
 Pat Buchanan - guitar
 Brad Jones - bass
 Greg Morrow - drums
 Jill Sobule - backing vocals (track 6)
 Garry Tallent - bass
 Francis Dunnery - vocals, bass, guitar

References

1995 albums
Francis Dunnery albums